Cecilia Nembou is an educator and women's rights activist from Papua New Guinea.

Background 
Nembou trained as a mathematician, receiving a BSc in Mathematics from the University of Papua New Guinea (1975), MSc in Operations Research from the University of Sussex (1978), and PGDip in Statistics from Canberra College of Advanced Education (1983). In 1992 she received her PhD in Operations Research from the University of New South Wales.

Career 

In January 2016 she was appointed president and vice-chancellor of Divine Word University, making her the first female vice-chancellor for a university in Papua New Guinea. She has worked as an academic and higher education administrator for over forty years.

Prior to her appointment at Divine Word University she held positions at the University of Wollongong in Dubai and University of Papua New Guinea. She spent two years at the University of Wollongong as Academic Registrar and Assistant Professor in Mathematics. She spent twenty five years at the University of Papua New Guinea, her positions included Senior Lecturer in Mathematics, Head of Mathematics Department, Executive Dean of School of Natural and Physical Sciences, Pro-Vice-Chancellor and Acting Vice-Chancellor.

Nembou is a former board member of Coalition for Change Papua New Guinea, an advocacy group that campaigns against gender based violence. She has also lobbied for the criminalisation of domestic violence in Papua New Guinea and for the adoption of the Family Protection Act.

References 

Living people
Papua New Guinean educators
University of Papua New Guinea alumni
Alumni of the University of Sussex
University of Canberra alumni
University of New South Wales alumni
Academic staff of the University of Wollongong
20th-century births
Year of birth missing (living people)
Date of birth missing (living people)
Place of birth missing (living people)